Toras Chaim may refer to:
 
Kollel Toras Chaim, South Africa, a component of Ohr Somayach, South Africa
Yeshiva Toras Chaim, Denver
Yeshiva Toras Chaim (Jerusalem), Jerusalem
Yeshiva Toras Chaim (East New York), a defunct yeshiva in Brooklyn
Yeshiva Toras Chaim of South Shore, Hewlett, New York
Toras Chaim (Chabad), a multi-volume work of Chabad philosophy by the dynasty's second Rebbe, Rabbi Dovber Schneuri